Nina is an unincorporated community in Doddridge County, West Virginia, United States, along Buckeye Creek.  Its post office
is closed

References 

Unincorporated communities in West Virginia
Unincorporated communities in Doddridge County, West Virginia